Heterochyta is a genus of moths of the family Xyloryctidae.

Species
 Heterochyta aprepta (Turner, 1947)
 Heterochyta asteropa Meyrick, 1906
 Heterochyta infesta (Meyrick, 1921)
 Heterochyta pyrotypa Common, 1996
 Heterochyta tetracentra (Meyrick, 1906)
 Heterochyta xenomorpha Meyrick, 1906

References

 
Xyloryctidae
Xyloryctidae genera